David Begnaud (born June 13, 1983) is an American journalist and news correspondent. Begnaud works for CBS News, and is currently based in New York City as the Lead National Correspondent for CBS Mornings. His reporting has been featured across CBS News broadcasts and platforms including CBS This Morning, the CBS Evening News, 48 Hours, CBS Sunday Morning, as well as CBS News Streaming, CBS News' 24/7 streaming news service.

Early life and education 
Begnaud is from Lafayette, Louisiana. He went to Catholic school and was an altar boy and Eucharistic minister. He started his career as a journalist after high school by working as a reporter for KLFY TV 10 in Lafayette, LA. Begnaud received a bachelor's degree in general studies from the University of Louisiana at Lafayette in 2005.

Career 
Begnaud worked at KSLA in Shreveport Louisiana from 2005 to 2007. Begnaud worked for Newsbreaker at Ora TV, based out of Los Angeles, CA. Prior to that on he worked at KTLA in Los Angeles from 2010 to 2012 and KOVR in Sacramento from 2007 to 2010. He joined CBS News in August 2015 as a Miami-based correspondent and was relocated to the network's Dallas bureau in January 2017.

In September 2017, Begnaud was sent to Puerto Rico by CBS News to report on Hurricane Irma and remained there for Hurricane Maria. From various locations in Puerto Rico, Begnaud filed multiple reports of conditions on the ground that were broadcast through CBS News. In addition, Begnaud reported through his own various social media accounts. His social media accounts have been hailed for helping keep followers in the mainland US informed about the conditions in Puerto Rico.

After his time in Puerto Rico for Hurricane Maria, Begnaud continued to file reports through CBS news, or his own social media accounts, on topics related to Puerto Rico and the Hurricane Maria recovery. CBS news also continued to send Begnaud to various locations, including additional trips to Puerto Rico, to report on other breaking stories such as a mistreated children's case in California, wildfires in California, and undocumented immigrant children separations.

In July 2019, Begnaud was back in Puerto Rico reporting on the Puerto Rico protests, and the resignation of then governor Ricardo Rossello and was received warmly by the Puerto Ricans on the island, who see him as their ally.

Personal life 
Begnaud resides in Manhattan. In 2018, Begnaud reported to Washington Blade that he and his partner, Jeremy, of Los Angeles had been together for almost 7 years. He also stated that he had come out to his family 10 years earlier. Begnaud came out publicly on June 24, 2018, by posting a picture with his partner after seeing pride celebrations in New York City.

Begnaud was diagnosed with Tourette syndrome at age 6. In December 2018, he revealed this fact publicly; he said his parents never allowed him to use it as an excuse for not succeeding, and that Tourette's was one of the primary motivators for him to persevere and succeed in journalism. His tics, which are mainly nonvocal, include sniffing.

Awards and honors 
In February 2018, Begnaud was awarded the George Polk journalism award for public service for his work reporting on Puerto Rico and Hurricane Maria. He was also designated a "Puerto Rican Champion" and participated in the 2018 Puerto Rican Day Parade in New York City. Begnaud is an honorary Puerto Rican highly esteemed by the people of Puerto Rico.

Notes

References

External links
 

21st-century American journalists
American television reporters and correspondents
CBS News people
American LGBT journalists
American gay writers
LGBT people from Louisiana
Journalists from Louisiana
George Polk Award recipients
University of Louisiana at Lafayette alumni
People with Tourette syndrome
Living people
1983 births
21st-century American LGBT people